Pibanga ochropyga is a species of beetle in the family Cerambycidae. It was described by Belon in 1896. It is known from Ecuador, Bolivia and Brazil.

References

Eupromerini
Beetles described in 1896